For the 2000 Summer Olympics, a total of thirty sports venues were used. After Melbourne hosted the 1956 Summer Olympics, Australia made several bids for the Summer Olympics before finally winning the 2000 Summer Olympics by two votes over Beijing, China. Venue construction was set at the Homebush Bay area of Sydney in an effort to rehabilitate the land. Environmental studies of the area in the early 1990s forced remediation to be used for about a fifth of the site selected. Fifteen new venues were constructed for the Games. Many of the venues used for the 2000 Games continue to be in use as of 2020, although some of the pre-existing facilities have been demolished and replaced.

Venues

Sydney Olympic Park

Sydney

Outside Sydney

Before the Olympics

Australia first hosted the Summer Olympics in 1956 at Melbourne. The main venue used was the Melbourne Cricket Ground which hosted the ceremonies (opening/closing), athletic events, and the finals for both field hockey and football.

Sydney first made preliminary plans for the 1972 and 1988 Summer Olympics, but they were not followed through. Melbourne made a bid for the 1988 Summer Games, but withdrew in February 1981. Brisbane made a bid for the 1992 Summer Olympics, losing out to Barcelona, while Melbourne finished fourth in the bidding for the 1996 Summer Olympics won by Atlanta. The first serious review for Sydney as an Olympic city took place in 1973 on rehabilitating the Homebush Bay area as an Olympic site, though those plans were not taken seriously until seven years later, when Sydney was making a preliminary bid for the 1988 Summer Games. Nick Greiner, who served as Premier of New South Wales from 1988 to 1992, led the effort to use the Olympics as a catalyst for rehabilitating Homebush Bay, forming a review committee on this in 1989. The Australian Olympic Committee endorsed this idea provisionally in December 1990 and officially three months later.

In the bid package submitted to the International Olympic Committee for Sydney, all of the venues would be located within 30 minutes of the Homebush Bay Area, where the Sydney Olympic Park would be constructed. Sydney was selected 45–43 over Beijing in the fourth round of exhaustive voting to host the 2000 Games at the IOC Meeting in Monte Carlo on 23 September 1993.

For site selection,  of Homebush Bay was selected for use though the area was not planned upon completion until 2010. Sydney's selection to host the 2000 Summer Olympics changed this. The States Sports Centre opened in 1984, and Bicentennial Park opened four years later. The Sydney International Aquatic Centre and Sydney International Athletic Centre were completed in 1994, but by 1995, it was determined by the Sydney Olympic Organising Committee that venue construction needed to be accelerated. In 1995, Bob Carr was elected as New South Wales Premier, with one of his first task was to develop a masterplan for venue construction. A plan was approved in February 1996, along with lessons learned from 1996 Summer Olympics, leading to modification of the plan in February 1997. Environmental consideration was taken during site selection and construction, including the planting of 16,000 trees around completed venues once construction was completed. Other items involved at the venues were the removal of electrical transmission lines, the development of rail lines near the venues, the construction of a new ferry wharf, and construction of vehicular parking sites.

Fifteen new venues were under construction by 1995, with all of them being completed in 1999. Temporary venues were added for beach volleyball and women's water polo in 2000, prior to the Olympics. 40,000 people were involved in venue construction for the Games.

The Olympic Stadium was constructed on the site of a cattle stockyard before they were sent to the slaughterhouse. Construction was delayed twice before commencing in earnest in September 1996. The stadium was completed in March 1999, and officially opened to the public three months later. The new Sydney Showground was built to replace the old Sydney Showground at Moore Park. The old Sydney Showground was first used in 1882 as part of the Sydney Royal Easter Show, but was starting to show its age by the 1970s. Construction of the new Showground at Homebush Bay began in October 1997, and was completed for the 1998 Royal Easter Show. The NSW Tennis Centre was constructed on a former home of the Australian Jockey Club from 1841 to 1869. The Sydney International Regatta Centre was constructed near a quarry in Penrith, a suburb of Sydney. It opened in July 1995, with competition starting eight months later. Penrith Whitewater Stadium was constructed following pleas to the IOC from the International Canoe Federation and French President Jacques Chirac after the sport was nearly excluded from the games. Holsworthy Barracks was the original site for the Sydney International Shooting Centre, but that was changed due to the site not being available. This resulted in the organisers renovating an existing shooting range to meet International Shooting Sport Federation standards, a renovation that took eighteen months to complete. Bondi Beach was constructed as a temporary venue between March and November 2000, and took up less than twenty percent of the beach area used.

Test events at the venues ran from September 1998 to August 2000.

During the Olympics

Before the start of the women's marathon, street personnel in Sydney had to tow 137 cars that were parked along the course. Japan's Naoko Takahashi won the event.

Canoe sprint events on the last day of the Games at the Regatta Centre were delayed for six hours by up to  wind gusts. The Regatta Center also had lane markers that were damaged and an official's aluminum dinghy sinking. Eight days earlier in the men's rowing coxless four final, Great Britain's Steve Redgrave won the gold medal in his fifth straight Olympics.

The endurance course of the equestrian eventing competition led to the hospitalization of two riders and four horses being injured, including one that was subsequently put to sleep. Meanwhile, the individual jumping final was held in the midst of high winds that forced volunteers to hold down some of the top rails until a rider approached.

After the Olympics
The Olympic Stadium, now Stadium Australia, continues to be used as of 2017, though with a reduced capacity of 83,500. The stadium was reconfigured after the games, making it suitable for rectangular pitch and oval ground sports with the removal of the athletics track and the use of retractable seating. For sport, the stadium is used for regular season National Rugby League (NRL) games and the NRL Grand Final. It also hosts State of Origin home games for the NSW Blues, and Rugby Union test matches involving the Wallabies. In a deal that ran from 2009 until 2015, the stadium was also host to all home finals for the NSW Waratahs in the Super Rugby competition (the Waratah's normally play at the Sydney Football Stadium). It was also used for the Big Bash League Twenty20 cricket games, as well as some games for the Sydney Swans and Greater Western Sydney Giants of the Australian Football League (AFL) until 2015. Stadium Australia also plays host to various concerts.

The Super Dome, now known as Qudos Bank Arena, continues to play host to numerous concerts, award nights and sporting events as of 2017. It currently hosts Sydney Kings National Basketball League games, having previously done so from 1999 to 2002. It is also the alternate home of the New South Wales Swifts, who play in the Suncorp Super Netball competition, as well as hosting international netball games involving the Australia Netball Diamonds. The venue hosted the 2015 Netball World Cup, with the final attracting a world netball record attendance of 16,752. In 2001, the arena played host to the Tennis Masters Cup. The arena also plays host to world championship boxing and mixed martial arts (used as a venue by the UFC), and is the Sydney venue used on tours of Australia by World Wrestling Entertainment (WWE).

Blacktown Olympic Park plays host to competitions for cricket, Australian Rules football, soccer, softball, and baseball. Australian Baseball League team the Sydney Blue Sox play their home games at the Blacktown Baseball Stadium located at the complex.

Penrith Whitewater Stadium hosted the ICF Canoe Slalom World Championships in 2005.

The Sydney Entertainment Centre, which opened in 1983, continued to be in use until it was closed in December 2015, hosting numerous concerts, sporting events and conventions. It was the home arena for the Sydney Kings, and occasionally played host to both national senior basketball teams, the Boomers (men) and the Opals (women). The venue hosted the 1991 World Netball Championships and the 1994 FIBA Women's World Basketball Championship. The Entertainment Centre was demolished in 2016.

The Sydney Convention and Exhibition Centre remained in use until it closed in December 2013, and was demolished in 2014 to make way for the new Sydney International Convention, Exhibition and Entertainment Precinct at Darling Harbour, which was due for completion by the end of 2016.

Sydney Football Stadium, an existing stadium that opened in 1988, continues to be in use as of 2017 by the NRL (including finals), A-League (including finals), and Super Rugby. The SFS also hosts various concerts, as well as other sporting events such as boxing and Rugby sevens. In 2012, it was increased in capacity from 42,000 to 45,500, and after a 2016 proposal to demolish the stadium and replace it with a 55,000 seat venue was defeated in parliament, plans were announced to refurbish the almost 30-year-old stadium.

The Homebush Street Circuit for the V8 Supercars was used at the Olympic precinct from 2009 to 2016. The circuit was designed by former multiple Australian Touring Car, CAMS Gold Star and Bathurst 1000 winner Mark Skaife. In 2015, V8 Supercars proposed to shorten the circuit to reduce the event's costs. This proposal failed, and in March 2016, it was announced that the ongoing costs of running the event would result in 2016 being the final running of the Sydney 500.

For the venues located outside of Sydney as of 2017, the Brisbane Cricket Ground, more commonly known as the Gabba, continues to play host to international and domestic cricket, and is also the home ground of the AFL's Brisbane Lions. It is also expected to be the main stadium of the 2032 Summer Olympics. Bruce Stadium, now known as Canberra Stadium, is the home venue of the NRL's Canberra Raiders and Super Rugby's Brumbies, and hosts occasional international rugby league, rugby union and soccer games. Hindmarsh Stadium (now Coopers Stadium) in Adelaide is the main home venue of the A-League's Adelaide United FC. Temporary seating used during the Olympics was removed after the games, and the stadium's capacity is now 17,000. The Melbourne Cricket Ground (MCG) underwent extensive renovations before hosting the 2006 Commonwealth Games. Now with a capacity of 100,024, it remains the home of the AFL, as well as international and domestic cricket in Melbourne.

References

 
2000 Summer Olympics
Sydney Olympic Park
2000